Florian Just (born 28 February 1982 in Nürnberg) is a German former competitive pair skater. With Mari Vartmann, he won four senior international medals and finished seventh at two European Championships. He also won four international medals with Katharina Gierok.

Career

Early career 
Florian Just began ice skating at the age of five at EC Nürnberg while also practicing artistic roller skating. He appeared on the Junior Grand Prix (JGP) circuit as a single skater. During the 1999 JGP series, he won gold in Zagreb, Croatia, and placed fourth at his second assignment, in Ostrava, Czech Republic. He qualified for the JGP Final, where he finished seventh. He is the only German skater to reach the final in men's singles.

Just was coached by Sieglinde Ruppel and Steffi Ruttkies. He moved to Munich because of the better training available at the Münchener EV. He continued competing in men's singles for five more years before switching to pair skating in Berlin. His first partner was Mariana Kautz.

Partnership with Vartmann 
In January 2004, Just teamed up with Mari-Doris Vartmann. They were coached originally by Julia Gnilozubova. In autumn 2004 they switched to Knut Schubert. They practiced in Dortmund and also in Berlin.

Vartmann/Just became three-time German national medalists and appeared at four ISU Championships, finishing 18th at the 2006 Worlds in Calgary, Alberta, Canada; 7th at the 2007 Europeans in Warsaw, Poland; 18th at the 2007 Worlds in Tokyo, Japan; and 7th at the 2008 Europeans in Zagreb, Croatia. They parted ways just after the 2009 NRW Trophy.

Partnership with Gierok 
In spring 2010, Just teamed up with Katharina Gierok. Karel Fajfr served as the pair's coach. Gierok/Just won silver at the 2010 NRW Trophy and bronze at the 2010 Warsaw Cup. At 2011 German Nationals, they won the bronze medal and were selected to compete at the European Championships. They finished 11th in their debut at the event. Gierok and Just parted ways at the end of the 2011–12 season.

Just was a member of the club Essener Jugend-Eiskunstlauf Verein and a sport-soldier in the Bundeswehr.

Programs

With Gierok

With Vartmann

Single skating

Competitive highlights 
GP: Grand Prix; JGP: Junior Grand Prix

Pairs career with Gierok

Pairs career with Vartmann

Singles career

References

External links 

 
 
 
 Vartmann-Just-Homepage

Living people
German male pair skaters
1982 births
Sportspeople from Nuremberg
20th-century German people
21st-century German people